William Edwin "Bud" Lewis (September 3, 1918 - October 31, 1989) was an American politician who served as a Missouri state representative.  Lewis was graduated from the De Soto public schools in 1937.  In 1940, he enlisted in the U.S. Army, serving with the 30th Infantry Division in the European Theater of World War II until 1945.  During the war, he married Virginia Louise Sapp on September 11, 1942.  In 1965, he retired from the U.S. Army Reserves at the rank of major.

References

External links

1918 births
1989 deaths
Democratic Party members of the Missouri House of Representatives
20th-century American politicians